The Balinese observe (besides the Gregorian calendar) two completely different and not synchronized calendars:
The Balinese pawukon calendar, a numeric calendar of 210 days per year
The Balinese saka calendar, a lunisolar calendar starting every Nyepi

 
Time in Indonesia